Tim Herbert (Herman Timberg, Jr., born Herbert Timberg; June 22, 1914 – June 20, 1986) was an American actor, comedian and vaudevillian.

Life and career 
Tim Herbert was born Herbert Timberg in New York, son of the vaudeville actor and songwriter Herman Timberg, who often appeared on stage with another show-business veteran, dancer Pat Rooney. The elders Timberg and Rooney worked their sons into the act. The younger Timberg and Rooney hit it off personally and professionally, and worked up their own act, incorporating dancing and comedy. To capitalize on their association with their fathers, they billed themselves as "Herman Timberg, Jr. and Pat Rooney, Jr."

Beginning in 1936 Timberg, Jr. and Rooney, Jr. co-starred in 10 musical-comedy short subjects for New York-based Educational Pictures. The series lapsed in 1938 when the financially troubled studio closed its doors. Timberg tried his luck as a producer of a stage revue, but when it closed Timberg returned to vaudeville and personal appearances with Rooney through 1940.

In the 1940s, Timberg adopted the stage name Tim Herbert, which he retained for the rest of his career. He was featured in vaudeville and in Broadway productions, including the revue Follow the Girls. In the 1950s he formed a double act with comedian Don Saxon, and they appeared in nightclubs and on television. During the 1960s Herbert established himself as a character actor in films and television. He appeared on The Dick Van Dyke Show (in the episode "Bupkis," as an anxious songwriter) and on The Addams Family, The Lucy Show, Get Smart, and other high-profile series. He also appeared as "Whiskers" in two episodes of Batman, as well as playing the villain Killer Moth in an unaired short episode in 1967, which was primarily filmed to introduce Batgirl into the series. Herbert also played incidental roles in motion pictures, including Don't Worry, We'll Think of a Title, The Boston Strangler, They Shoot Horses, Don't They?, Duel and Win, Place or Steal, and in television films like Ellery Queen: Don't Look Behind You, Goodnight, My Love, and Terror on the 40th Floor.

Herbert died of a heart attack on June 20, 1986 in Los Angeles, California.

Filmography

References

External links 
 

1914 births
1986 deaths
Male actors from New York (state)
Vaudeville performers
American male film actors
American male television actors
20th-century American male actors